Between 1842 and 1849, 234 juvenile offenders were transported to the Colony of Western Australia on seven convict ships. From 1850 to 1868, over 9,000 convicts were transported to the colony on 43 convict ship voyages. Western Australia was classed as a full-fledged penal colony in 1850.

Voyages transporting Parkhurst apprentices to Western Australia
Parkhurst apprentices were juvenile prisoners from Parkhurst Prison, sentenced to "transportation beyond the seas", but pardoned on arrival at their destination on the conditions that they be "apprenticed" to local employers, and that they not return to England during the original term of their sentence. Between 1842 and 1849, Western Australia accepted 234 Parkhurst apprentices, all males aged between 10 and 21. As Western Australia was not then a penal colony, contemporary documents studiously avoided referring to the prisoners as "convicts", and the ships that brought them were not officially recognised as convict ships there. English records were not so reticent, classing as convict ships the seven ships that transported Parkhurst apprentices to Western Australia.

This is a list of convict ship voyages that transported Parkhurst apprentices to Western Australia.

Voyages transporting convicts to Western Australia

This is a list of convict ship voyages that transported convicts to Western Australia during its time as a penal colony between 1850 and 1868.

See also
Convict era of Western Australia
Convict ships to New South Wales
Convict ships to Norfolk Island

Notes

References

Convict ship voyages to Western Australia, List of
 
Convict ship voyages